Marko Šćekić (born May 23, 1981) is a Bosnia-born Serbian professional basketball coach and former player who is a staff member of Borac Banja Luka of the Basketball Championship of Bosnia and Herzegovina.

Professional career
A  power forward, Šćekić played for Drina Zvornik, Borac Banja Luka, Vojvodina Srbijagas, Turów Zgorzelec, EWE Baskets Oldenburg, Budućnost, and Mapooro Cantù. On August 3, 2013, Šćekić signed with Cimberio Varese. In September 2014, he signed an open-contract with Igokea. In early November 2014, Igokea released him. In March 2014, he signed with the Slovenian club Helios Suns Domžale. He retired as a player with Jedinstvo Bijelo Polje in 2015.

In February 2019, Šćekić came out of retirement and signed for Borac Banja Luka for the rest of the 2018–19 season. He was an assistant coach for Borac at the time.

National team career 
Šćekić was a member of the Serbia and Montenegro university team that won a bronze medal at the 2005 Summer Universiade in İzmir, Turkey.

Coaching career 
After retirement in 2015, Šćekić joined was hired as an assistant coach for Igokea. Afterward, he was an assistant coach for Borac Banja Luka before he was hired as the new head coach for Borac Banja Luka in May 2019. In December 2020, Šćekić got fired as the head coach of Borac.

Career achievements 
As player
 German League champion: 1 (with EWE Baskets Oldenburg: 2008–09)
 Montenegrin League champion: 1 (with Budućnost: 2010–11)
 German Super Cup winner: 1 (with EWE Baskets Oldenburg: 2009)
 Montenegro Cup winner: 1 (with Budućnost: 2010–11)
As head coach
 First League of R Srpska champion: 1 (with Borac: 2019–20)

References

External links
 Marko Šćekić at euroleague.com
 Marko Šćekić at eurobasket.com
 Marko Šćekić at realgm.com

1981 births
Living people
ABA League players
Bosnia and Herzegovina men's basketball players
Bosnia and Herzegovina basketball coaches
Bosnia and Herzegovina expatriate basketball people in Serbia
EWE Baskets Oldenburg players
OKK Borac coaches
OKK Borac players
KK Borac Banja Luka players
KK Budućnost players
KK Igokea players
KK Vojvodina Srbijagas players
Pallacanestro Cantù players
Pallacanestro Varese players
People from Zvornik
Power forwards (basketball)
Serbian men's basketball coaches
Serbian expatriate basketball people in Germany
Serbian expatriate basketball people in Italy
Serbian expatriate basketball people in Montenegro
Serbian expatriate basketball people in Poland
Serbian expatriate basketball people in Slovenia
Serbian men's basketball players
Serbs of Bosnia and Herzegovina
Universiade medalists in basketball
Universiade bronze medalists for Serbia and Montenegro
Medalists at the 2005 Summer Universiade
Helios Suns players